Boris Nicola Bakalov (born 23 November 1980) is a former professional Bulgarian tennis player. On 21 November 2011, he reached his highest ATP singles ranking of 621 whilst his best doubles ranking was 457 on 4 July 2011. He played for and graduated from Azusa Pacific University in 2006.

Year-end rankings

Challenger and Futures Finals

Singles: 1 (0–1)

Doubles: 11 (3–8)

References

External links
 
 

Bulgarian male tennis players
1980 births
Living people
21st-century Bulgarian people